Legislative elections were held in France on 27 April and 11 May 1902. The result was a victory for the Bloc des gauches alliance between Socialists, Radicals, and the left wing of the Republicans, over the anti-Dreyfusard right wing of the Republicans, the progressistes. The Bloc des gauches had been brought together to support the "Republican Defense Cabinet" (gouvernement de défense républicaine) formed by Pierre Waldeck-Rousseau following the assault on the newly elected president, Émile Loubet, on the Longchamp Racecourse on 4 June 1899, during the Dreyfus affair.

However, Waldeck-Rousseau's own supporters (the ARD) took few seats in the election compared to the Radicals and Socialists. After the election, President Loubet invited the Radical Émile Combes to form a government, which lasted until January 1905, when the Socialists withdrew from the Bloc des gauches.

Results

References

L'année Politique 1902, by André Daniel, Librairie Académique Perrin, 1903

External links
Map of Deputies elected in 1902 according to their group in the House, including overseas (in french)

Legislative elections in France
France
Legislative